Begonia tabonensis is an endemic species of Begonia discovered in Tabon Cave, Lipuun Point, Municipality of Quezo, in Palawan, Philippines. This species resembles B. mindorensis Merr., widely ovate and uniformly green leaves, and inflorescence with sessile glands. However the two species differs on several characteristics: Begonia tabonensis have shorter petioles(10 cm long), smaller leaves(4-8 x 4–6.4 cm); deciduous, chartaceous, glabrous or very sparsely glandular bracts; and slightly pointed, crescent-shaped ovary wing; whereas, B. mindorensis have longer petioles(25 cm long), larger leaves(10-15 x 6-10 cm); persistent, coriaceous, densely glandular bracts; and acute, triangular ovary wing.

Etymology
The specific epithet refers to Tabon Cave where the new species was discovered.

References

tabonensis
Endemic flora of the Philippines